Maynooth Students' Union (MSU) is the students' union which represents the students of Maynooth University and St. Patrick's Pontifical University, formerly St. Patrick's College, Maynooth.

Maynooth Students' Union is a constituent organisation of the Union of Students in Ireland. MSU rejoined the USI in 2009 after disaffiliating from it in 2001. In 2013, 2016, and 2019 there were other student body referendums to disaffiliate from the USI, but students voted to remain.

The original students' union building and bar, on the west of the north campus (formerly known as "the auld barn") was replaced in 1993, shortly after the development of the restaurant (now the site of the Phoenix) and sports building, which was built in 1991. This housed the student's union offices and shop which had been in the Arts faculty block. In 2018, as part of the Maynooth University development plan, proposals for a new student centre were commenced, with completion planned for 2022. However, in September 2022, Maynooth University announced that construction on the new student centre had been cancelled citing rising construction costs. This prompted MSU to engage the student body in a campaign which became known as #WheresMyLevy.

References

Students' unions in Ireland
Maynooth University
St Patrick's College, Maynooth